Urruela is a surname. Notable people with the surname include:

Acisclo Valladares Urruela (born 1976), Guatemalan attorney and notary
Federico Urruela (1952–2004), Guatemalan diplomat and lawyer
José Luis Chea Urruela, Guatemalan politician